Tunxis State Forest is a state forest located in the towns of Hartland, Barkhamsted, and Granby in Connecticut, United States. The forest surrounds Barkhamsted Reservoir and borders the Granville State Forest in Massachusetts. The forest is used for hiking, mountain biking, cross-country skiing, fishing, hunting, and letterboxing. Several trails cross the forest, including the northern end of the blue-blazed Tunxis Trail.

References

Further reading
Tunxis Mainline Trail Connecticut Museum Quest

External links
Tunxis State Forest Connecticut Department of Energy and Environmental Protection

1923 establishments in Connecticut
Barkhamsted, Connecticut
Connecticut state forests
Granby, Connecticut
Hartland, Connecticut
Parks in Hartford County, Connecticut
Protected areas established in 1923